Isaac Sowells (born May 4, 1982) is a former American football guard. He was drafted by the Cleveland Browns in the fourth round of the 2006 NFL Draft. He played college football at Indiana.

Sowells has also been a member of the Cincinnati Bengals, Hartford Colonials, and Detroit Lions.

Early years
Sowells attended Doss High School in Louisville.

College career
Sowells played college football for Indiana University. He played in 27 games and was a general studies major.

Professional career

Cleveland Browns
Sowells was selected by the Cleveland Browns in the fourth round (112th overall) in the 2006 NFL Draft. Sowells was released by the Browns on September 4, 2009, as they made their final roster cuts.

Cincinnati Bengals
Sowells was signed by the Cincinnati Bengals on June 1, 2010. He was waived on September 4.

Detroit Lions
On August 4, 2011, Sowells signed with the Detroit Lions, but was waived on August 21.

Personal life
Sowells resides in Louisville, Kentucky with his wife Latrese Sowells, his daughter Halani, and two sons Isaac Jr. and Keiyan. He is now a police officer with the Louisville Metropolitan Police Department and coaches football at Louisville Central High School.

External links
Cincinnati Bengals bio

1982 births
Living people
American football offensive guards
Cleveland Browns players
Cincinnati Bengals players
Indiana Hoosiers football players
Players of American football from Louisville, Kentucky
Hartford Colonials players
Detroit Lions players
People from Strongsville, Ohio
Sportspeople from Cuyahoga County, Ohio
Doss High School alumni